Yuri Vasilyevich Prokhorov (15 December 1929 – 16 July 2013) was a Russian mathematician, active in the field of probability theory.  He was a PhD student of Andrey Kolmogorov at the Moscow State University, where he obtained his PhD in 1956.

Prokhorov became a corresponding member of the Russian Academy of Sciences in 1966, a full member in 1972.  He was a vice-president of the IMU.  He received Lenin Prize in 1970, Order of the Red Banner of Labour in 1975 and 1979.  He was also an editor of the Great Soviet Encyclopedia.

See also 
 Lévy–Prokhorov metric
 Prokhorov's theorem

References
 Larry Shepp, "A Conversation with Yuri Vasilyevich Prokhorov", Statistical Science, Vol. 7, No. 1 (February, 1992), pp. 123–130.

External links 
 Yuri Prokhorov — scientific works on the website Math-Net.Ru
Yuriĭ Vasilʹevich Prokhorov  — scientific works in MathSciNet
 
 Prokhorov's Biography (in Russian)
 Yuri Vasilevich Prokhorov (in Russian)
 Obituaries: Yuri Vasilyevich Prokhorov

20th-century Russian mathematicians
Soviet mathematicians
Probability theorists
Full Members of the USSR Academy of Sciences
Full Members of the Russian Academy of Sciences
Moscow State University alumni
1929 births
2013 deaths